Philipsburg-Osceola Area School District is a small, rural, public school district located in a region which straddles two central Pennsylvania counties. In Centre County it serves Rush Township and Phillipsburg, Pennsylvania. In Clearfield County it serves Wallaceton and Decatur Township, Chester Hill, Osceola Mills. It was created by the joining of Osceola High School and Philipsburg High School. According to 2000 federal census data, it serves a resident population of 14,228. By 2010, the Philipsburg-Osceola Area School District's population grew to 15,410 people. In 2009, the Philipsburg-Osceola Area School District residents’ per capita income was $15,752, while the median family income was $36,746. In the Commonwealth, the median family income was $49,501 and the United States median family income was $49,445, in 2010.

District Schools
There are 4 schools operating in the Philipsburg-Osceola Area School District.
Philipsburg-Osceola Area High School
Philipsburg-Osceola Middle School
Philipsburg Elementary School
Osceola Mills Elementary School

Extracurriculars
The school offers a variety of clubs, activities and an extensive sports program.

Sports
The District funds:

Boys
Baseball - AA
Basketball- AA
Cross Country - AA
Football - AA
Golf - AA
Soccer - AA
Track and Field - AA
Wrestling  - AAA

Girls
Basketball - AA
Cheer - AAAA
Cross Country - AAA
Golf - AA
Soccer (Fall) - AA
Softball - AA
Track and Field - AA
Volleyball - AA

Junior high school sports

Boys
Basketball
Football
Soccer
Track and Field
Wrestling 

Girls
Basketball
Softball 
Soccer (fall)
Track and Field

According to PIAA directory July 2012

References

External links

School districts in Centre County, Pennsylvania
School districts in Clearfield County, Pennsylvania